Wonder Party is the third EP by South Korean girl group Wonder Girls. It was released digitally on June 3, 2012, and physically on June 6, 2012. The lead single "Like This" was released on June 3. Also, its deluxe version was released in United States on June 19, 2012. This is also marks their last mini-album to feature members Sunye and Sohee before her departure of the group on December 2013 and 2014.

Background and release
The album was first confirmed by their company and was scheduled to be released in early June. It was also announced that they will be stepping away from the retro-style genre and will focus on more powerful dance tracks for the summer season. J.Y. Park recently wrote via his Twitter page, "Wonder Girls’ US album now complete, and all the songs on their Korean album have unanimously been approved."
 Wonder Party was released on their second mini album So Hots fourth anniversary. Album was physically released in South Korea three days later. On June 19, 2012, album was released in United States in deluxe edition. In Malaysia, album was released in early 2013.

Awards

Track listing

Credits and personnel
Members
Sunye – vocals (all tracks)
Yeeun – vocals (all tracks), songwriting, production (tracks 1, 4)
Yubin – rapping (all tracks), songwriter (track 3)
Sohee – vocals (all tracks)
Hyelim – vocals (all tracks)
Arrangement
Yeeun (tracks 1, 7)
Lee Woo-min (tracks 1, 4, 7)
Park Jin-young (tracks 2, 8)
Hong Ji-sang (tracks 2, 8)
Sangmi Kim (track 3)
Jerry Barnes (track 3)
Rodger Green (track 3)
Katreese Barnes (track 3)
Mr. Cho (tracks 6, 9)

Charts

Weekly charts

Monthly charts

Year-end charts

Sales

Release history

References

External links

Wonder Girls albums
2012 EPs
Dance-pop EPs
Korean-language EPs
JYP Entertainment EPs